Lopheros is a genus of net-winged beetles in the family Lycidae. There are about eight described species in Lopheros.

Species
These eight species belong to the genus Lopheros:
 Lopheros crassipalpis
 Lopheros crenatus (Germar, 1824)
 Lopheros fraternus (Randall, 1838)
 Lopheros harmandi
 Lopheros konoi
 Lopheros lineatus (Gorham, 1883)
 Lopheros minimus
 Lopheros rubens (Gyllenhal, 1817)

References

Further reading

External links

 

Lycidae
Articles created by Qbugbot